Police (German until 1945: Pölitz) is a town in the West Pomeranian Voivodeship, in northwestern Poland. It is the capital of Police County and one of the biggest towns of the Szczecin agglomeration.

The town is situated on the Oder River and its estuary, south of the Szczecin Lagoon and the Bay of Pomerania.

Etymology
The name of the town comes from Proto-Slavic pole, which means field.

History 

The settlement was first mentioned in 1243. Pomeranian duke Barnim of Pomerania granted Magdeburg law to the town in 1260. At the end of the 13th century, the town had become a fief of a local dynasty of knights, the Drake family. In 1321, with the death of Otto Drake, the town became a dependency of nearby Stettin (now Szczecin), hindering its growth until the mid-18th century.

Nearby Jasienica Abbey, now within the Police city limits, was secularized during the Protestant Reformation, which was adapted in the Duchy of Pomerania in 1534. After its secularization, the abbey became a ducal domain, and was the site of the treaty that for the first time partitioned the duchy into a western and eastern part (Pomerania-Wolgast and Pomerania-Stettin) in 1569.

From the Treaty of Stettin (1630) until the Treaty of Stockholm (1720), Pölitz was part of Swedish Pomerania, and of Prussian Pomerania thereafter. In 1808, Pölitz became independent from Stettin again. In 1815, Pölitz became part of the restructured Province of Pomerania, administered within Landkreis Randow county. In 1939, this county was dissolved and Pölitz was made part of Groß-Stettin.

German synthetic fuel factory
In 1937, the synthetic fuel plant Hydrierwerke Pölitz AG was founded by IG Farben, Rhenania-Ossag, and Deutsch-Amerikanische Petroleum Gesellschaft which by 1943 was producing 15% of Nazi Germany's synthetic fuels, 577,000 tons. The plant derived its workforce from an adjacent system of camps (Pommernlager, Nordlager, Tobruklager, Wullenwever-Lager, Arbeitserziehungslager Hägerwelle, Dürrfeld Lager) plus a ship moored on the Oder River serving as a camp (Umschulungslager Bremerhaven). In addition, a subcamp of the Stutthof concentration camp was located in Pölitz.

During World War II, the plant made Pölitz a nine-time bombing target of the Allied Oil Campaign from late April 1943 onward, leading to 70% of the town being destroyed.

Post–World War II
The city with the plant was captured by the Soviet Union’s Red Army during the Battle of Berlin on 26 April 1945. While most of the former German territory east of the Oder-Neisse line became Polish, Pölitz, situated on the western bank of the Oder, remained a Soviet-administered exclave: Marshal Zhukov decreed the establishment of a Soviet county with Pölitz, Ziegenort, Jasenitz, Messenthin and Scholwin. 25,000 German workers had to disassemble the plant before it was sent to the USSR.

Gradually, the area without the plant was given to Poland: Mścięcino (formerly Messenthin) on 7 September 1946, and Police (formerly Pölitz) with Jasienica (formerly Jasenitz) on 19 September. On 25 February 1947 the plant also passed to Polish control. As a result, the Soviet Union allowed Polish annexations of German land west of the river Odra, beyond the border as agreed on the Potsdam Conference.

Polish settlers, partially expellees from the east of former Poland, arrived in the region to replace the German population that had fled or were forcibly expelled. They were joined by refugees from Greece and Yugoslav Macedonia in 1953.

The ruins of the plant still remain standing, though they are not secured and are dangerous to visit.

A large chemical plant (Zakłady Chemiczne "Police") was built in the town in 1969 and has grown since to become one of the largest in Poland. It produces mostly titanium dioxide pigments and nitrogen and phosphorus fertilizers.

Police was in the Szczecin Voivodeship from 1946 to 1998. Since 1999 the town has been part of the West Pomeranian Voivodeship.

Districts 
Police Old Town
Mścięcino
Jasienica
New Town (Nowe Miasto: Osiedle Dąbrówka, Osiedle Gryfitów, Osiedle Księcia Bogusława X, Osiedle Anny Jagiellonki)

Notable buildings from the pre-WW2 era:
the ruins of Jasienica Abbey, a former Augustinian abbey in Police-Jasienica (14th century)
a Gothic Church in Police-Jasienica (14th/18th century)
a Gothic Chapel (15th century) in The Chrobry Square in The Old Town
a Neo-Gothic Church (19th century) in the Old Town
the Police Lapidary in The Staromiejski Park in the Old Town
Tenement houses (19th century)
Town hall (1906) (not rebuilt after WWII)

The tourist and cultural information office is localised in The Gothic Chapel in Bolesław Chrobry Square in The Old Town of Police

Geography and nature

Police is situated on the Oder River and an estuary of the Oder River - Roztoka Odrzańska, south of the Lagoon of Szczecin and the Bay of Pomerania. Police is at located in the Ueckermünder Heide with the Świdwie Nature Reserve around Lake Świdwie near Tanowo and Dobra.

A kayak route follows the Gunica River from Węgornik through Tanowo, Tatynia and Wieńkowo to Police-Jasienica. At the Szczecin Lagoon is a small yacht marina on the mouth of the Łarpia River (part of Oder) - 'Olimpia'. The ruins of the synthetic petrol plant (Hydrierwerke Pölitz – Aktiengeselschaft) are now a habitat of bats (Barbastelle, Greater mouse-eared bat, Daubenton's Bat, Natterer's bat, Brown long-eared bat).

Population 

1740: 1,000
1850: 2,500
1960:  8,900
1970: 12,800
1975: 17,600
1980: 24,800
1983: 28,581
1990: 34,400
1995: 34,456
2000: 35,000
2004: 41,400
2014: 41,745

Infrastructure 
Major roads under state control connect Police to Trzebież and Nowe Warpno, No. 114; to Tanowo, No. 114; and to Szczecin over Przęsocin.

Main streets in Police include: ul. Tanowska, ul. Bankowa, ul. Grunwaldzka, ul. Kościuszki, ul. Jasienicka, ul. Dworcowa, ul. Piastów, ul. Wojska Polskiego, ul. Asfaltowa, ul. Cisowa, ul. Piłsudskiego, and ul. Wyszyńskiego.

Railway:

Szczecin - Police - Trzebież

Harbours:
Port of Police: Sea-Harbour
Port of Police: River-Harbour

Airport in Goleniów, a town behind the Oder River (Szczecin-Goleniów "Solidarność" Airport)
Public transport:
10 bus lines in a town. Bus communication between all districts of a town, a few villages near Police (Trzeszczyn, Tanowo, Siedlice, Leśno Górne, Pilchowo, Przęsocin, LS to Trzebież over Dębostrów, Niekłończyca and Uniemyśl) and Szczecin City.
Taxicab

Culture and sport 

 Chemik Police - football club
 KPS Chemik Police - female volleyball club
 Łarpia Sail Festival - shanty music festival - in May, periodic
 Augustinian Fair (Polish: Jarmark Augustiański) in Jasienica - at the end of August, periodic
 Police Nationwide Quarter-Marathon (Ćwierćmaraton Policki) - in October, periodic
 Police Music Days (Polish: Polickie Dni Muzyki "Cecyliada") - in October, periodic

Hospital 
A clinic hospital in Police (Siedlecka Street, The New Town, Osiedle Gryfitów) is a part of The Pomeranian Medical University.

Notable residents 
Ludwig Hollonius (1570s-1621), pastor and playwright
Hans Modrow (born 1928), former premier of East Germany

Major corporations 
 Zakłady Chemiczne Police SA
 Port of Police (The Seaport, The Barge Port, The 'Mijanka' cargo berth)
 Industrial Park - Policki Park Przemysłowy (Infrapark Police)

Twinning cities
The sister cities of Police are:
 Pasewalk, Germany
 Novyi Rozdil, Ukraine
 Slagelse, Denmark

Towns near Police
 Szczecin, Poland
 Nowe Warpno, Poland
 Goleniów, Poland
 Eggesin, Germany
 Ueckermünde, Germany
 Pasewalk, Germany

See also
 Villages in Police County: Przęsocin, Kołbaskowo, Trzebież
 Szczecin Lagoon
 Wkrzanska Forest

References
 Notes

External links

 Official town webpage
 History of Police
 The Factory: Zakłady Chemiczne "Police"
 Police Harbour
 Police on www.city-map.pl
 Jasienica VR360

 
Cities and towns in West Pomeranian Voivodeship
Police County
Port cities and towns in Poland
Socialist planned cities